"Tumbalalaika" is a Russian Jewish folk and love song in the Yiddish language.  is the Yiddish word for 'noise' and a balalaika is a stringed musical instrument of Russian origin.

Lyrics

Meaning
While most versions use  ('a stone') as the answer to "what can grow without rain", some versions use  ('understanding').

Cultural references and covers
 The song Over and Over by Nana Mouskouri uses this melody.
 The song, "Tumbalalaika (The Riddle)" by Natalia Zukerman is a poetic adaptation of this to English, with the chorus remaining in Yiddish.
 Benny Hill adapted the melody for one of his own compositions, Anna Marie, which he performed on his first special for Thames Television on November 19, 1969.
 The film Khrustalyov, My Car! shows a young Jewish boy singing the song in Russian.
 The song is used in the film Swing by Tony Gatlif.
 The song is used in the play Angels in America: A Gay Fantasia on National Themes by Tony Kushner and the film based on this play. It is sung by the ghost of Ethel Rosenberg to Roy Cohn, dying of AIDS.
 The song is used in the film Prendimi l'anima/The Soul Keeper (2002) by Roberto Faenza.
 The metal version of the song is included in the first Metal Yiddish album AlefBase by Gevolt, released in March 2011
 A pastiche of the song is used in the play The Hamlet of Stepney Green: A Sad Comedy with Some Songs by Bernard Kops.
The latter used to play in his concerts for children. Also included in Cançons catalanes de Folk in 1976 (Terra Nostra).
 The song appears in the novel The City Beautiful by Aden Polydoros.

References

Jewish folk songs
Yiddish-language songs
Year of song unknown